Malole is a constituency of the National Assembly of Zambia. It covers the towns of Malole, Mashati, Mungwi and Munuka in Mungwi District of Northern Province.

List of MPs

References

Constituencies of the National Assembly of Zambia
1973 establishments in Zambia
Constituencies established in 1973